The Office for Cooperation with Churches and Religious Communities of the Republic of Serbia is a coordination body of the Government of Serbia. It was constituted on 2 August 2012 via founding statute of Serbian government.

Organization and jurisdiction
The director is in charge of the Office, and is appointed by the Government of Serbia. The mandate of the director is 5 years. First director is Mileta Radojević.

The jurisdiction of the Office is established by its founding statute: 
 Affirmation and improvement of freedom of religion
 Cooperation of the state with churches and religious communities and improvement of their position within society
 Affirmation of religious elements in Serbian national identity
 Assistance in protection and preservation of religious elements in national identity of minorities in Serbia
 Cooperation of the state with dioceses based abroad
 Affirmation and development of religious culture
 Assistance in development of religious education
 Assistance in religious construction and preservation of religious cultural heretege
 Providing assistance in improvement of material and social position and status of churches and religious communities

References

External links
 Founding statute (in Serbian)
 Official site
 Serbian orthodox church, official site

Government agencies of Serbia
Religion in Serbia